Cabriel or Cabriol is a tributary of the Júcar River in the province of Albacete, Spain. It has its source in the Montes Universales.

See also 
 List of rivers of Spain

External links 

Rivers of Spain
Rivers of Aragon
Rivers of the Valencian Community